Sewer Shark is a first-person rail shooter video game, and is the first on a home console to use full motion video for its primary gameplay. It was originally slated to be the flagship product in Hasbro's Control-Vision video game system, which would use VHS tapes as its medium. However, Hasbro cancelled the Control-Vision platform, and Digital Pictures later developed the game for the Sega CD expansion unit. Sewer Shark is one of the first titles for the Sega CD and one of its best-selling games, leading Sega to eventually bundle it with Sega CD units. It was later ported and released for the 3DO in 1994. A port was also planned for the SNES-CD, but that system was cancelled.

Plot 
Sewer Shark takes place in a post-apocalyptic future where environmental destruction has forced most of humanity to live underground. The player takes on the role of a rookie pilot in a band of "sewer jockeys", whose job is to exterminate dangerous mutated creatures to keep a vast network of sewers clean for "Solar City", an island paradise from which the evil Commissioner Stenchler (Robert Costanzo) gives his orders and critiques. The player's copilot, Ghost (David Underwood), evaluates the player's performance throughout the game, while a small robot named Catfish (voiced by Robert Weaver) scouts ahead and gives directions. The player is later assisted by Falco (Kari G. Peyton), a female jockey who believes that there is a hidden route to the surface. Falco is later captured by Stenchler, who threatens to mutate her into one of his mindless minions. This plot is thwarted when Ghost and the player reach Solar City.

Gameplay 

The objective of Sewer Shark is to travel all the way from the home base to Solar City without crashing or running out of energy, and while maintaining a satisfactory level of performance as judged by Ghost and Commissioner Stenchler. As in other rail shooters, the ship mostly flies itself, leaving the player to shoot ratigators (mutant crosses between rats and alligators), bats, giant scorpions and mechanical moles. Along the way, Catfish gives the player directions. If the player takes a wrong turn or misses a turn, they eventually hit a dead end and crash, ending the game. Later in the game, Catfish is replaced by a "crazy lookin' thing", which visually guides the player through the sewers.

The ship has a limited amount of energy, which depletes slowly during flight and while firing. Scorpions also rob the ship of energy if the player fails to shoot them down. This energy can be partially replenished at recharge stations. In later areas, the ship encounters occasional pockets of hydrogen that the player must have Catfish detonate to pass through safely.

At certain times, Ghost or Stenchler interrupt the player to give direct feedback. If the player is doing well, they are allowed to continue and are occasionally given a promotion in the form of a new call sign. A poor performance will eventually cause the game to end.

Sewer Shark is often referred to as an interactive movie due to its use of full motion video to convey the action, and the navigation aspect of the game is frequently compared to Dragon's Lair, since turns are gates that the player must pass through to continue playing.

Production 
The game originated on the cancelled VHS-based Control-Vision video game console. The video was split into four distinct tracks that were interleaved frame-by-frame, and the hardware would switch between tracks to, for example, show a turn being taken or ignored, along with the outcome of that decision (e.g. crashing into a wall). In converting the game to the Sega CD platform, Digital Pictures maintained this approach by having the console read all four tracks worth of data as a single continuous stream to minimize seek time on the CD. To work within the console's limitations, the developers wrote a custom video codec to highly compress the data streams so they could be read in realtime from the CD. This codec was also used in Night Trap and the Make My Video series, and an improved version was later used in Prize Fighter.

The video footage in Sewer Shark was directed by visual effects artist John Dykstra.

According to Digital Pictures president Tom Zito, Sewer Shark cost $3 million to develop.

Reception 

Sewer Shark is one of the Sega CD's best-selling games, with more than 100,000 units sold prior to having been bundled with the system.

The game is on the Associated Press list of top ten video games from 1993. They called it "bizarre and wildly entertaining" and a must-have game for all Sega CD owners.

According to the "Review Crew" retrospective feature on DefunctGames, Sewer Shark received generally positive reviews among most of the major game magazines at the time. The site quotes GamePro Magazine as saying "Sewer Shark is an awesome hybrid of hot shoot-em-up video game action and state-of-the-art CD graphics...", although Electronic Gaming Monthly gave the game a 6 out of 10, saying: "Whoopie! Another full motion video CD game with no plot  real game play. ... Guiding a crosshair in a repetitive maze in order to blast rodents and bats is not my idea of hot shooter action! ... wait 'til next year."

Entertainment Weekly wrote that "it is one of the first games to incorporate humans in live-action, full-motion video footage. And with the promise of movie-quality pictures, audiophile sound, and fast frames-per-second animation, CD-ROM figures to be the shape of games to come." Mega Action magazine gave a review score of 82 out of 100 stating that "the graphics and stereo sound make this a must to your collection". Power Unlimited gave a score of 78% writing: "Sewer Shark is another interactive movie that took advantage of the capabilities of the Sega CD. It was therefore one of the reasons that the device flopped. The visuals were of low quality and the game was boring and short. Good voices."

References

External links 
 
 

1992 video games
3DO Interactive Multiplayer games
Full motion video based games
Rail shooters
Science fiction video games
Sega CD games
Digital Pictures
Epic/Sony Records games
Video games developed in the United States
Post-apocalyptic video games
Single-player video games